Livre d'orgue is a French term which usually designates a collection of pieces for organ (lit. "organ book"). It may refer to many such publications, including:

Livre d'orgue (Messiaen), by 20th century French composer Olivier Messiaen
Livre d'orgue de Montréal, a manuscript collection, brought to North America from France, dating from the early 18th century
, a manuscript collection dating from the early 18th century
Livre d'orgue by André Raison (1688)
Livre d'orgue by Pierre du Mage (1708), only extant work.
Livre d'orgue by Louis-Nicolas Clérambault (1710)
Three livres d'orgue by Nicolas Lebègue (1676, 1678 & 1685)
Livre d'orgue by Nicolas de Grigny (1699, with a posthumous edition in 1711).

See also
French organ Mass
French organ school

Sources

Compositions for organ
Baroque music